Ice Peak is a stratovolcano, located  west of Tatogga and  south of Mount Edziza, British Columbia, Canada. It overlaps the 7.5-million-year-old Armadillo Peak. It lies on a large volcanic plateau, which is made of basaltic lava flows from the massive Mount Edziza volcanic complex. Ice Peak last erupted during the Holocene.

The summit of Ice Peak is a remnant of the western rim of a small summit caldera, which has been nearly destroyed by alpine glaciation.

Ice Peak gets name because it is almost completely surrounded by glaciers.

See also
 List of volcanoes in Canada
 List of Northern Cordilleran volcanoes
 Volcanology of Canada
 Volcanology of Western Canada

References

Mount Edziza volcanic complex
Stratovolcanoes of Canada
Two-thousanders of British Columbia
Calderas of British Columbia
Pleistocene volcanoes
Polygenetic volcanoes